The Northern Colorado Writers Workshop is an invitation-only, non-profit writing workshop founded in 1972 by Edward Bryant.  The writing genres of its members include mainly science fiction, fantasy, horror, and mystery.  Membership in the workshop is generally limited to professional and near-professional writers, and includes a number of Hugo, Nebula, Bram Stoker, International Horror Guild, and World Fantasy Award winners.

References

External links
 Official website 

American writers' organizations
Science fiction culture
Arts organizations based in Colorado
Arts organizations established in 1972
1972 establishments in Colorado